Jason Kamras (born December 12, 1973) was selected as the 2005 National Teacher of the Year and was an adviser on education policy to the 2008 Barack Obama presidential campaign . He now serves as Superintendent of Richmond Public Schools (RPS).

Prior to his current role, Mr. Kamras served in a number of senior roles at District of Columbia Public Schools (DCPS).  His work was instrumental to DCPS achieving unprecedented gains in student learning, student and staff satisfaction, graduation rates, and enrollment, prompting former Secretary of Education Arne Duncan to highlight DCPS as one of the fastest improving urban districts in the nation.

Mr. Kamras began his career in education in 1996 as a seventh and eighth grade mathematics teacher at John Philip Sousa Middle (formerly Junior High) School (DCPS), a National Historic Landmark for its role in desegregating public education in the nation's capital.  He taught at Sousa for eight years, receiving numerous awards, including the Mayor's Arts Award for infusing photography into his mathematics instruction.

Mr. Kamras views public education as means of promoting equity and justice for all children in the United States.  In his various roles, he has advocated for policies to eliminate the "opportunity gap" that disadvantages many low-income children and children of color, and has led efforts to dismantle institutionalized racism in public schools and other public institutions ..

Mr. Kamras holds a bachelor's degree in public policy from Princeton University and a master's degree in education from the Harvard Graduate School of Education.

His wife Miwa also works in the field of public education, and he has two elementary school-aged sons, both of whom are RPS students.

References

External links
C-SPAN Q&A interview with Kamras, May 8, 2005

Living people
Schoolteachers from Washington, D.C.
People from Sacramento, California
Princeton University alumni
Harvard Graduate School of Education alumni
1973 births
Teach For America alumni